Lamberto dalla Costa (April 14, 1920 – 1982) was an Italian bobsledder who competed in the late 1950s. He won the gold medal in the two-man event at the 1956 Winter Olympics in Cortina d'Ampezzo.

Biography
Dalla Costa was a jet pilot by trade who competed only on the Cortina track in his spare time.

References
Bobsleigh two-man Olympic medalists 1932-56 and since 1964
DatabaseOlympics.com profile
TIME February 6, 1956 article featuring Dalla Costa. - Accessed August 12, 2007.
Wallechinsky, David. (1984). "Bobsled: Two-man". In The Complete Book of the Olympics: 1896-1980. New York: Penguin Books. pp. 558–9.

External links
 
 

1920 births
1982 deaths
Bobsledders at the 1956 Winter Olympics
Italian aviators
Italian male bobsledders
Olympic medalists in bobsleigh
Medalists at the 1956 Winter Olympics
Olympic gold medalists for Italy